The Lonely Bull, released in 1962, is the debut album by Herb Alpert & the Tijuana Brass.

Most of the tracks on the album were geared toward the TJB's Mariachi sound. There were also a few cover versions of popular songs, a trend which would grow in their next two albums, Volume 2 and South of the Border.

"Limbo Rock" covered a novelty dance song that had been a calypso-style hit by Chubby Checker. "Struttin' With Maria" was later used as the theme for a TV game show called Personality, hosted by Larry Blyden. The tune "Acapulco 1922" uses the old song "Oh, You Beautiful Doll" (by Seymour Brown and Nat D. Ayer, 1911) as a starting point, with a mariachi spin.

Track listing

Reception
The album was originally issued in both mono and stereo versions, though the stereo version essentially had the mono version on the right channel with a separate solo trumpet track on the left. Because of this, critics have noted that when listened on headphones, the stereo album sounds excessively "heavy" on one side. This led many later fans to prefer the mono version.

The original stereo version of the album has since been reissued on the Shout! Factory music label.

The mono version of the title track, "The Lonely Bull," can be found on the Herb Alpert compilation Definitive Hits.

References

1962 debut albums
Herb Alpert albums
Albums produced by Jerry Moss
Albums produced by Herb Alpert
A&M Records albums
Instrumental albums